Amphidromus sekincauensis is a species of sinistral or dextral air-breathing tree snail, an arboreal gastropod mollusk in the family Camaenidae.

Distribution 
Indonesia, Sumatra Island.

Habitat 
In trees.

References 

sekincauensis
Molluscs described in 2007